Reiherstieg Schiffswerfte & Maschinenfabrik, also known as Reiherstiegwerft, was a German shipbuilding company, located on the  Reiherstieg River in Hamburg. It was founded in 1706 by Lucas Kramer.

In the 1880s, Reiherstieg built , the first warship built in Hamburg for the German Navy.

During World War I Reiherstiegwerft built three U 151 U-boats for the Kaiserliche Marine, the U-151, U-152 and U-153.

External links

roosen.net webpage about Reiherstiegwerft (in German)

Manufacturing companies based in Hamburg
Manufacturing companies established in 1706
Companies established in 1706
Defunct companies of Germany
Shipbuilding companies of Germany
1706 establishments in the Holy Roman Empire